He Who Laughs Last is a 1925 American silent drama film directed by Jack Nelson and starring Kenneth MacDonald, David Torrence and Gino Corrado.

Cast
 Kenneth MacDonald as Jimmy Taylor
 Margaret Cloud as Janice Marvin
 David Torrence as George K. Taylor
 Gino Corrado as Elwood Harkness
 Harry Northrup as 	James Marvin

References

Bibliography
 Connelly, Robert B. The Silents: Silent Feature Films, 1910-36, Volume 40, Issue 2. December Press, 1998.
 Munden, Kenneth White. The American Film Institute Catalog of Motion Pictures Produced in the United States, Part 1. University of California Press, 1997.

External links
 

1925 films
1925 drama films
1920s English-language films
American silent feature films
Silent American drama films
Films directed by Jack Nelson
American black-and-white films
1920s American films